Jules Joseph Bonnot (14 October 1876 – 28 April 1912) was a French bank robber famous for his involvement in a criminal anarchist organization dubbed "The Bonnot Gang" by the French press. He viewed himself as a professional and avoided bloodshed, preferring to outwit his targets.

Further reading 

 Cacucci, Pino. (2006) Without a Glimmer of Remorse. ChristieBooks. .
 Parry, Richard. (1987) The Bonnot Gang. Rebel Press. .

External links 

1876 births
1912 deaths
People from Doubs
Illegalists
French anarchists
French bank robbers
People convicted of assault
People shot dead by law enforcement officers in France
French Army soldiers